Bochica (also alluded to as Nemquetaha, Nemqueteba and Sadigua) is a figure in the religion of the Muisca, who inhabited the Altiplano Cundiboyacense during the arrival of the Spanish conquistadors in the central Andean highlands of present-day Colombia. He was the founding hero of their civilization, who according to legend brought morals and laws to the people and taught them agriculture and other crafts.

Description 
Similarly to the Incan god Viracocha, the Aztec god Quetzalcoatl and several other deities from Central and South American pantheons, Bochica is described in legends as being bearded. The beard, once mistaken as a mark of a prehistoric European influence and quickly fueled and embellished by spirits of the colonial era, had its single significance in the continentally insular culture of Mesoamerica. The Anales de Cuauhtitlan is a very important early source which is particularly valuable for having been originally written in Nahuatl, the language of the Aztec. The Anales de Cuauhtitlan describes the attire of Quetzalcoatl at Tula:

Immediately he made him his green mask; he took red color with which he made the lips russet; he took yellow to make the facade; and he made the fangs; continuing, he made his beard of feathers..." (Anales de Cuauhtitlan, 1975, 9.)

In this quote the beard is represented as a dressing of feathers, fitting comfortably with academic impressions of Mesoamerican art. The connotation of the word 'beard' by Spanish colonizers was a foundation for embellishment and fabrication of an original European influence in Mesoamerica.

Not one cultural representation of either of these gods, painted, sculpted, et cetera, show them bearded in any sense the Spanish colonizers believed they would have been. There is no evidence in the abundance of Mesoamerican art of European influence, most stridently ruled out by the likenesses they gave themselves and their gods.

There have been questions on the authenticity of the preserved stories, and to what level they have been corrupted by the beliefs and imagery incorporated by Spanish Christian missionaries and monks who first chronicled the native legends.

Legend 
According to Chibcha legends, Bochica was a bearded man who came from the east. He taught the primitive Chibcha people ethical and moral norms and gave them a model by which to organize their states, with one spiritual and one secular leader. Bochica also taught the people agriculture, metalworking and other crafts before leaving for the west to live as an ascetic. When the Muisca later forsook the teachings of Bochica and turned to a life of excess, a flood engulfed the Savannah of Bogotá, where they lived. Upon appealing for aid from their hero, Bochica returned on a rainbow and with a strike from his staff, created the Tequendama Falls, through which the floodwaters could drain away.

Bochica appeared in Pasca in Cundinamarca and later in Gámeza, Boyacá where the people showed him hospitability. He retreated in the Toya cave where many caciques visited him for wisdom. Caciques from Tópaga, Tota, Pesca, Firavitoba and others consulted Bochica. After the supreme being of the Muisca, Chiminigagua sent them to Sugamuxi the city became a sacred place where the Temple of the Sun would be erected and religious festivities organised around the arrival of Bochica.

See also 
Idacansás

References

Bibliography

Further reading 

 

Muisca gods
Pre-Columbian mythology and religion
Primordial teachers
Flood myths
Muysccubun